Luxembourg competed at the 1984 Summer Olympics in Los Angeles, United States.

Results by event

Archery
In its third appearance in Olympic archer, Luxembourg was represented by two men and one woman.  Veteran Andre Braun improved his score from four years earlier by over 70 points, but dropped eight places in the rankings due to a more competitive field.  Jeannette Goergen tied Braun's 1980 performance for best ranking, at 16th place.

Women's Individual Competition

Men's Individual Competition

Athletics
Men's Marathon

References 

Nations at the 1984 Summer Olympics
1984
1984 in Luxembourgian sport